Mechnica  (German Mechnitz) is a village in the administrative district of Gmina Reńska Wieś, within Kędzierzyn-Koźle County, Opole Voivodeship, in south-western Poland.

The village has a population of 890.

References

Mechnica